Emil Bretschneider ( in Bankaushof (now Benkavas muiža, Saldus novads, Latvia) –  in Saint Petersburg) was a sinologist of Baltic German ethnicity and a correspondent member of the Académie française.  He operated in the Russian Empire.  He graduated from the medical school of University of Dorpat in Dorpat Estonia, and was first posted as a physician by the Russian legation to Tehran (1862–65). From 1866 to 1883 he was posted as physician by the Russian legation to Pekin.

Overview 
In 1866 the publication of book titled Cathay and the Way Thither by orientalist Henry Yule stirred up Bretschneider's interest in sinology.  However, he felt that the extensive material contained in Chinese books was under-utilized by western sinologists because many of them did not read Chinese, and when they quoted Chinese material, they relied on secondhand sources.  Emil Bretschneider while in Pekin befriended the Archimandrite Palladius Kafarov of the Russian Orthodox Church Mission to Pekin, a famous sinologist in his own right; Bretschneider also took advantage of the excellent library of the Russian Orthodox mission with an extensive collection of Chinese books on history, geography and botany, he began his own first hand research into ancient Chinese literature, particularly in botany and geography.

In 1870 he published his first article in sinology: "Fu Sang-- Who discovered America ?", followed by the publication in London of "On the Knowledge Possessed by the Chinese of the Arabs and Arabian Colonies Mentioned in Chinese Books".

In 1875, he published the article "Notes on Chinese medieval travellers to the West" in Shanghai. In 1881 he published "Early European researches into the flora of China (American Presbyterian Mission Press, Shanghai), a topic often ignored by contemporary sinologists due to their lack of training in botany. In this field Bretschneider was a pioneer.

In 1888 he published Mediaeval Researches from Eastern Asiatic Sources, Trübner Oriental Series, London: Trübner & Co.; this book included his English translation of three important Chinese
works about the history and geography of central Asia, namely Travel to the West by Yelü Chucai, Genghis Khan's chief adviser; Travels to the West by the Taoist monk Kiu Chang Chun and The Peregrinations of Ye-Lu Hi-Liang (the grandson of Yelu Chucai), translated from the Annals of the Yuan dynasty.

He was a correspondent member of the Académie française.

Work in botany
Bretschneider was less known as a botanist, having his own herbarium in the mountains close to Pekin. Starting in 1880, Bretschneider sent dried plant specimens to the Royal Botanic Gardens, Kew.

Among the books he published in the field of botany are: "On the Study and Value of Chinese Botanical Works" (1870); "Early European Researches into the Flora of China" (1881); "Botanicum Sinicum" (1882); and his vast "History of European Botanical Studies in China" (1898).

The plant species Bretschneidera sinensis was named in Bretschneider's honor.

Works
Notes on Chinese Mediaeval Travellers to the West

See also
 List of Baltic German scientists

References

1833 births
1901 deaths
People from Saldus Municipality
People from Courland Governorate
Baltic-German people
19th-century botanists from the Russian Empire
Sinologists from the Russian Empire
University of Tartu alumni